Sagar is a 2012 Kannada romantic drama film  starring Prajwal Devaraj, Radhika Pandit, Sanjjanaa and Haripriya in the lead roles. The story, screenplay and direction is by M. D. Sridhar. Gurukiran is the music director of the film. Produced by Ramu, the film's cinematography is by Krishna Kumar.

Plot
Hailing from the aristocratic industrialist Rajasekhara Murthy family, Sagar (Prajwal Devaraj) is forced to tell a lie that he is in love with Kajal. That is when the marriage is fixed with him and Priyanka (Haripriya). They decide that unless both fall in love, they will not marry. To prevent this marriage, Sagar comes up with an idea. Accordingly, Kajal (Radhika Pandit) arrives in the house. The family agrees on this and what happens next is the action portion, because Kajal is followed by international don Sonu (Dev Gill). How Sagar saves Kajal and accepts her, is the remaining portion of the film.

Cast 
 Prajwal Devaraj as Sagar
 Radhika Pandit as Kajal
 Sanjjanaa Galrani as Jennifer
 Haripriya as Priyanka
 Dev Gill as Sonu
 Vinaya Prasad
 Avinash as Rajashekara Murthy
 Sharath Lohitashwa
 Sangeetha
 Ganesh Rao Kesarkar 
 Suresh Anchan 
 Aadi Lokesh 
 Kaddipudi Chandru

Soundtrack 

Gurukiran has composed the songs to the lyrics of Kaviraj. The Audio has been distributed by Anand Audio.

Reception 
A Sharadhaa from The New Indian Express wrote "The comical element has worked well whenever it has appeared. With a star cast consisting of well known actors, the film has done quite well. Gurukiran has done a decent job with remixes and peppy songs. Dialogues were well written. Cinematography by Krishna Kumar is an asset to the movie". A critic from The Times of India scored the film at 3.5 out of 5 stars and says "While Prajwal Devaraj has given a matured performance, Radhika Pandit impresses you with her expressions. Haripriya gives a glamorous touch to her role with an impressive performance. AV Krishnakumar’s cinematography is amazing. Music director Gurukiran has given catchy tunes to the lyrics of Kaviraj. BA Madhu’s dialogues are impressive". B S Srivani from Deccan Herald wrote "Radhika gets the meaty part which she plays with cool detachment. Avinash, Sharath Lohitashwa, Vinaya Prakash, Adi Lokesh and the rest are adequate. Dev Gill projects raw aggression, but only just. Sagar is more about emotions than just about the hero, deftly handled. A frothy entertainer at its best". A critic from Bangalore Mirror wrote  "Prajwal is good in the romantic part and uncharacteristic in action. Radhika proves why she bags awards by the handful. Haripriya plays out her role well and credit should got to seasoned Avinash and Sharat Lohitashva who make the film grand with their presence. It is the import Dev Gill who pales in comparison though the dubbing of his voice by Gurukiran is a perfect fit". A critic from India Today wrote  "While the fights and three songs are good, the inclusion of some unnecessary sequences in the second half drags the film. Even the story does not offer any freshness, but the production values makes the film much attractive. The comedy portions in the film are weak, but the song picturisations are a strong attraction of the film".

References

External links
 

2012 films
2010s Kannada-language films
Films scored by Gurukiran
Films directed by M. D. Sridhar